Allahabad Prayagraj Mayoral Constituency is one of the 14 mayoral constituencies of Uttar Pradesh.

Total Number of Voters

List of Mayors

Election Results

References

 http://indianexpress.com/article/india/infighting-cloud-over-bjp-allahabad-mayor-nominees-chances-4954878/lite/
 https://www.outlookindia.com/newswire/amp/up-municipal-polls-bjp-wins-7-mayoral-posts/768020

A